The Journal of Financial and Quantitative Analysis is a peer-reviewed bimonthly academic journal published by the Michael G. Foster School of Business at the University of Washington in cooperation with the W. P. Carey School of Business at Arizona State University and the University of North Carolina's Kenan-Flagler Business School. It publishes theoretical and empirical research in financial economics. Topics include corporate finance, investments, capital markets, securities markets, and quantitative methods of particular relevance to financial researchers.

See also
William Sharpe Award

References
.

.

.

.

.

External links
 Journal home page

Finance journals
Bimonthly journals
Cambridge University Press academic journals